Laughable Loves is a collection of seven short stories by Milan Kundera which mix the extremes of tragedy with comic situations in (mostly romantic) relationships.

Stories
 "Nobody Will Laugh"  A young professor loves to play mind-games with people he deems inferior.  After putting off reviewing the work of an aspiring (and hopeless) scholar, he loses the young woman he was involved with, directly after realizing he loved her.

 "The Golden Apple of Eternal Desire"  Two middle-age men flirt with many girls and proposition them. One of the men is married to a woman he loves, and the other would rather read a book.

 "The Hitchhiking Game"  A couple plays a role-playing game which initially excites them but then later scares one and repulses the other.

 "Symposium"   The first of two stories involving the character Dr. Havel, this is set in the hospital with several other doctors and a nurse. Dr. Havel is known for his multitudes of sexual exploits, and the nurse is interested in him, but he rejects her.

 "Let the Old Dead Make Room for the Young Dead"  A woman visits her husband's grave in a cemetery only to find out that it has been removed in the favor of another grave that of a man who had died 'more recently.' This impacts upon her life as a person and is a major factor when she goes to visit a former lover.

 "Dr. Havel After Twenty Years"  The second Dr. Havel story takes place ten years after "Symposium," when Dr. Havel feels less powerful and attractive, yet is reminded of his attractiveness by his young, beautiful wife.

 "Eduard and God"  A young man called Eduard has a religious girlfriend but he personally has to stay away from religion because of his job in a school. It makes for difficult times for him when he is seen with his girlfriend at a church.

Adaptations

"The Hitchhiking Game" has been commonly studied in college classrooms and was adapted to film, sharing the same title, in 2008 by director Darian Lane.

References

1969 short story collections
Alfred A. Knopf books
French short story collections
Czech short story collections